Evolution is an EP by American indie rock group Open Hand. It was recorded by Justin Isham at The Loft in Los Angeles, California in January 2000, and released by the American Propaganda label. Guest appearances on the record come from Keith Barney of Eighteen Visions and Throwdown, and from Paxton Pryor.

Track listing

2000 EPs
Open Hand albums